The Beat Stuff is the debut six track EP by Canadian singer-songwriter Hannah Georgas. Originally released independently in 2008 as a five-song release, the EP was later picked up by Hidden Pony Records (with distribution through EMI Canada), which released a new edition in early 2009 with the extra track "Gabriella".

The EP garnered radio airplay for the singles "The Beat Stuff" and "The National".

Starbucks licensed "The Beat Stuff" for play in its cafés. During her tour to support the EP, a commercial music supervisor also saw her performance in New York City, and licensed her new non-album track, "You've Got a Place Called Home", for use in a Wal-Mart commercial.

Georgas won CBC Radio 3's Bucky Award for Best New Artist in 2009.

Track listing 

All songs written by Hannah Georgas.

Credits 
Musicians:
Hannah Georgas - Vocals, Acoustic Guitar, Keys, Glockenspiel
Robbie Driscoll - Bass, Banjo, Glockenspiel
Winston Hauschild - Guitars, Ukulele, Percussion
Niko Friesen -  Drums, Percussion
Joe Cruz - Guitars on "All I Need" and "The National"

Production:
Recorded by Shawn Cole and Winston Hauschild
Mixed by Dr. Boss
Mastered by Joao Carvalho

References

2009 EPs
Hannah Georgas albums